National Tulip Day (Dutch: Nationale Tulpendag) is an annual event in January that preludes the tulip season in the Netherlands. The event has been held on the Dam Square in the centre of Amsterdam since 2012. In 2021 and 2022 it was cancelled because of the Covid pandemic. In 2023 the event took place at Museum Square (Museumplein). During this day a special garden of 200,000 tulips covers the square. In the morning people can view the tulips from a gangway, and in the afternoon they can pick tulips for free. The tulips are from North Holland.

See also 
Flower bulb cultivation in the Netherlands
Keukenhof

Sources 
Nationale Tulpendag, De Telegraaf, 16 January 2014
Gratis tulpen op De Dam, De Telegraaf, 18 January 2014
Gratis tulpen op de Dam, NRC, 17 January 2014

Agriculture in the Netherlands
Gardens in the Netherlands
Tourist attractions in Amsterdam
Parks in Amsterdam
Flower festivals in the Netherlands
Recurring events established in 2012
2012 establishments in the Netherlands
Winter events in the Netherlands